Aethes beatricella, the hemlock yellow conch, is a species of moth of the  family Tortricidae. It was described by Walsingham in 1898. It is found in Great Britain, Sweden, Denmark, the Netherlands, France, Spain, Italy, Austria, the Czech Republic, Slovakia, Hungary, Bosnia and Herzegovina, Romania, Ukraine, Russia and Algeria. The habitat consists of waste grounds, woodland fringes and hedgerows.

Adults are on wing from June to July.

The larvae feed on Pastinaca sativa and Conium species.

References

beatricella
Moths described in 1898
Moths of Europe
Moths of Africa